USS McNeal may refer to the following ships of the United States Navy:

, a United States Navy minesweeper in commission from 1917 to 1919
, a United States Navy minesweeper in commission from 1917 to 1919

See also

United States Navy ship names